Arp 220 is the result of a collision between two galaxies which are now in the process of merging. It is the 220th object in Halton Arp's Atlas of Peculiar Galaxies.

Features

Arp 220 is the closest Ultraluminous Infrared Galaxy (ULIRG) to Earth, at 250 million light years away. Its energy output was discovered by IRAS to be dominated by the far-infrared part of the spectrum.
It is often regarded as the prototypical ULIRG and has been the subject of much study as a result.
Most of its energy output is thought to be the result of a massive burst of star formation, or starburst, probably triggered by the merging of two smaller galaxies. HST observations of Arp 220 in 2002 and 1997, taken in visible light with the ACS, and in infrared light with NICMOS, revealed more than 200 huge star clusters in the central part of the galaxy.
The most massive of these clusters contains enough material to equal about 10 million suns.
X-ray observations by the Chandra and XMM-Newton satellites have shown that Arp 220 probably includes an active galactic nucleus (AGN) at its core, which raises interesting questions about the link between galaxy mergers and AGN, since it is believed that galactic mergers often trigger starbursts, and may also give rise to the supermassive black holes that appear to power AGN.

Luminous far-infrared objects like Arp 220 have been found in surprisingly large numbers by sky surveys of submillimetre wavelengths using instruments such as the Submillimetre Common-User Bolometer Array (SCUBA) at the James Clerk Maxwell Telescope (JCMT).
Arp 220 and other relatively local ULIRGs are being studied as equivalents of this kind of object.

Astronomers from the Arecibo Observatory have detected organic molecules in the galaxy.

Arp 220 contains at least two bright maser sources, an OH megamaser, and a water maser.

In October 2011, astronomers spotted a record-breaking seven supernova all found at the same time in Arp 220.

The merging of the two galaxies started around 700 million years ago.

References

External links

 "Hubble Sees Star Birth Gone Wild" (SpaceDaily) Jun 16, 2006
 

Spiral galaxies
Interacting galaxies
Starburst galaxies
IC objects
09913
55497
220
18660504
20111002
Luminous infrared galaxies
Serpens (constellation)